Jack Creek is a water conservation area and park in Highlands County, Florida. It is part of the Southwest Florida Water Management District.

References

 

Southwest Florida Water Management District reserves
Parks in Highlands County, Florida